Victoria Bridge may be a reference to:

Bridges
Australia
 Victoria Bridge, Brisbane, a road bridge across the Brisbane River in Brisbane
 Victoria Bridge, Devonport a road ridge across the Mersey River in Devonport, Tasmania
 Victoria Bridge, Melbourne, a road bridge across the Yarra River, in Melbourne
 Victoria Bridge, Picton, a timber trestle bridge that crosses Stonequarry Creek in Picton, New South Wales
 Victoria Bridge, Townsville, a historic bridge across the Ross Creek in northern Queensland
 Victoria Bridge (Penrith), also known as Nepean River Bridge, a road and pedestrian bridge (may also refer to the adjacent rail bridge)

New Zealand
 Hamish Hay Bridge, Christchurch, formerly known as Victoria Street Bridge
 Victoria Bridge, Cambridge, New Zealand, a road bridge across the Waikato River in Cambridge
 Victoria Bridge, Hamilton, a road bridge across the Waikato River in Hamilton

United Kingdom
 Royal Victoria Dock Bridge, a footbridge across the Royal Victoria Dock near the ExCeL Exhibition Centre in London, England
 Victoria Bridge, Aberdeen, correctly known as Queen Victoria Bridge
 Victoria Bridge, Bath,  a cable-stayed bridge over the River Avon in Bath, England
 Victoria Bridge, Cambridge, England, a road bridge across the River Cam in Cambridge, England
 Victoria Bridge, Datchet, a road bridge across the River Thames at Datchet in Berkshire, England
 Victoria Bridge, Glasgow, a road bridge across the River Clyde in Glasgow, Scotland 
 Victoria Bridge, Hereford, a foot bridge in Hereford.
 Victoria Bridge, Manchester, a road bridge across the River Irwell in Greater Manchester
 Victoria Bridge, Mar Lodge Estate, an iron road bridge across the River Dee on Mar Lodge Estate, Aberdeenshire, Scotland
 Victoria Bridge (Stockton-on-Tees), a road bridge across the River Tees between Stockton-on-Tees and Thornaby-on-Tees in Northern England
 Victoria Bridge, Worcestershire, railway bridge in Worcestershire, England
 Victoria Swing Bridge, a disused swing bridge across the Water of Leith in Edinburgh
 Victoria Viaduct, a disused railway bridge near Washington, Tyne and Wear, England.
 Victoria Bridge, Aberlour, a footbridge near Aberlour, Scotland
 Chelsea Bridge, a road bridge in London formerly called Victoria Bridge
 Grosvenor Bridge, a rail bridge across the River Thames in London, England, that is sometimes called the Victoria Rail Bridge

Rest of world
 Victoria Bridge, Malaysia, a rail bridge across the Perak River in Perak, Malaysia
 Victoria Bridge (Montreal), a road and rail bridge across the Saint Lawrence River at Montreal in Canada
 Traffic Bridge (Saskatoon), popularly known as Victoria Bridge, a road bridge across the South Saskatchewan River in Saskatoon, Canada

Places
 Victoria Bridge, County Tyrone, a small village in Northern Ireland
 Victoria Bridge, Nova Scotia, Canada, a community on Cape Breton Island